{{Infobox settlement
|name                   =  Bolibhadra Union
|native_name            = বলিভদ্র ইউনিয়ন
|native_name_lang       = bn
|image_skyline          =
|imagesize              = 
|image_caption          = 
|image_flag             =
|image_map              =
|mapsize                =
|map_caption            = 
|pushpin_map            = Bangladesh
|pushpin_label_position = 
|pushpin_map_caption    = Location of Bolibhadra in Bangladesh
|pushpin_mapsize        =
|subdivision_type       = Country
|subdivision_name       = Bangladesh
|subdivision_type1      = Division
|subdivision_name1      = Dhaka Division
|subdivision_type2      = District
|subdivision_name2      = Tangail District
|subdivision_type3      = Upazila
|subdivision_name3      = Dhanbari Upazila
|government_type        =
Union Council
|leader_title           = Chairman
|leader_name            = Md Suruzzaman Montu (Bangladesh Awami League)<ref>
Bolibhadra Union is a union of Dhanbari Upazila, Tangail District, Bangladesh.

Demographics
According to the 2011 Bangladesh census, Bolibhadra Union had 3,550 households and a population of 13,898. The literacy rate (age 7 and over) was 44.2% (male: 46.3%, female: 42.2%).

See also
 Union Councils of Tangail District

References

Populated places in Tangail District
Unions of Dhanbari Upazila